Steven Kerry Hamilton (born 7 September 1970) is a former Australian rules footballer who played with North Melbourne in the Australian Football League (AFL).

Hamilton was selected by North Melbourne at pick 74 in the 1988 National Draft, from North Adelaide. He made six appearances in the 1990 AFL season and received two Brownlow Medal votes for his efforts in a win over Fitzroy at Princes Park. Hamilton returned to North Adelaide in 1991 and was a member of their premiership team that year. He joined West Adelaide in 1994.

References

External links
 
 

1970 births
Australian rules footballers from South Australia
North Melbourne Football Club players
North Adelaide Football Club players
West Adelaide Football Club players
Living people